The Japanese shortnose spurdog (Squalus brevirostris) is a dogfish shark in the genus Squalus. It is found from southern Japan to the South China Sea.

References

Squalus
Fish described in 1917